Bill Edelstein (born c.1948) is an American bridge player. He is from Philadelphia.

Bridge accomplishments

Wins

 North American Bridge Championships (1)
 Blue Ribbon Pairs (1) 1976

Runners-up

Notes

American contract bridge players
Living people
Year of birth missing (living people)